Landsverk L-5 was one of the first tanks designed by the Swedish industrial company Landsverk. It was first produced in 1929 as a series of experimental wheeled-and-tracked vehicles utilizing the wheel-cum-track system. It never entered service and the prototype remained uncompleted.

References
Tanks of the World 1915-1945 by Peter Chamberlain and Chris Ellis 1972/2002 p 159.
http://aviarmor.net/tww2/tanks/germany/rader_m28.htm
https://tanks-encyclopedia.com/ww2-sweden-germany-rader-raupen-kampfwagen-m28-landsverk-5/

Tanks of Sweden
World War II tanks